A Bird in the Head is a 1946 short subject directed by Edward Bernds starring American slapstick comedy team The Three Stooges (Moe Howard, Larry Fine and Curly Howard). It is the 89th entry in the series released by Columbia Pictures starring the comedians, who released 190 shorts for the studio between 1934 and 1959.

Plot
The Stooges are mediocre paperhangers. Their boss Mr. Beedle (Robert Williams) advises the boys to do a good job, but the result looks like it was quickly cluttered with paper towels. Beedle is fuming, and threatens to kill the boys, who make a quick escape across the hallway into the laboratory of the insane Professor Panzer (Vernon Dent) and his assistant Nikko (Frank Lackteen). Panzer is searching for a human brain puny enough to place in the head of his gorilla Igor (Art Miles). Curly becomes the prime candidate, and Panzer locks the boys in his lab in order to secure Curly's "contribution." Then Igor gets loose, but takes a liking to Curly, which the feeble-minded Stooge reciprocates. Eventually, the boys destroy Panzer's lab and quickly depart, taking Igor with them.

Cast
 Moe Howard as Moe
 Larry Fine as Larry
 Curly Howard as Curly 
 Vernon Dent as Professor Panzer
 Frank Lackteen as Nikko
 Robert Williams as Mr. Beedle
 Art Miles as Igor the Gorilla (uncredited)

Production notes
The title A Bird in the Head is a pun on the phrase "a bird in the hand is worth two in the bush." A Bird in the Head was filmed over a period of five days (April 9–13, 1945), which was longer than usual. Due to the death of President Franklin D. Roosevelt on April 12, filming ended early out of respect for the deceased Commander-in-chief.

41-year-old Curly Howard had suffered a series of minor strokes prior to filming A Bird in the Head. As a result, his performance was marred by slurred speech, and slower timing. This film was the first directing effort for former Columbia sound man Edward Bernds. Bernds was thrilled that he was being given a shot at directing, but was horrified when he realized that Curly was in such bad shape (something Columbia short subject head/director Jules White failed to alert Bernds of). Years later, Bernds discussed his trying experience during the filming of A Bird in the Head:

Realizing that Curly was no longer able to perform in the same capacity as before, Bernds devised ways to cover his illness; Curly could still be the star, but the action was shifted away from the ailing Stooge. In A Bird in the Head, the action focuses more on crazy Professor Panzer and Igor. This allowed Curly to maintain a healthy amount of screen time without being required to contribute a great deal.

Bernds often commented that he and Jules White never really got along. Bernds feared that his directing days would be over as soon as they began if he released A Bird in the Head with a weak Curly as his first entry. Producer Hugh McCollum reshuffled the release order, and the superior Micro-Phonies was released first, securing Bernds directing position.

The Screen Gems television print deleted a scene where Curly and the gorilla drink some alcohol in the laboratory and suffer hilarious after effects.

References

External links 
 
 
A Bird in the Head at threestooges.net

1946 films
Columbia Pictures short films
The Three Stooges films
American black-and-white films
1946 comedy films
Films directed by Edward Bernds
American comedy short films
1940s English-language films
1940s American films